Wincenty Konstanty Kalinowski, also known as Kastuś Kalinoŭski ( also) ( – ), was a Russian writer, journalist, lawyer and revolutionary. He was one of the leaders of the Polish Lithuanian and Belarusian national revival and the leader of the January Uprising in lands of the former Grand Duchy of Lithuania in the Polish–Lithuanian Commonwealth.

One of several participants in the failed January Uprisings, Kalinowski is especially revered in Belarus where he is seen as a forefather and icon of Belarusian nationalism.

Early life and education

Kalinowski was born in Mastaŭliany, in Grodnensky Uyezd of the Russian Empire (now Mostowlany, Poland) to a szlachta family. The Kalinowski family hailed from the Polish region of Mazovia and bore the Kalinowa coat of arms. His father, Szymon, was a manager of the Mastaŭliany farm and manor. His older brother,  would become a historian. In 1849 his father, Szymon bought a folwark near Świsłocz (now Svislach, Belarus) where Kastuś grew up.

After graduating from a local school in Świsłocz in 1855, Kalinowski entered the faculty of Medicine of the University of Moscow as an external student. After one semester he moved to St. Petersburg, where his brother was and joined the faculty of Law at the University of St. Petersburg. Along with his brother Victor, he got himself involved in Polish students' conspiracies and secret cultural societies, headed by Zygmunt Sierakowski and Jarosław Dąbrowski. After graduating in 1860, Konstanty traveled to Vilnius where he unsuccessfully applied to join the civil service under .

Career

Literary work
Konstanty then returned to the Grodno area in 1861. Konstanty started publishing Mużyckaja prauda (Peasants' Truth), the first newspaper in Belarusian, written in Łacinka, first published in June 1862. The Peasants' Truth was issued seven times until 1863. Konstanty also published two other Polish language newspapers. Konstanty was more aligned with the Reds which represented a democratic movement uniting peasants, workers, and some clergy rather than the more moderate Whites.

In his literary work, Kalinoŭski underlined the need to liberate all people of the former Polish–Lithuanian Commonwealth from Russia's occupation and to conserve and promote the Greek-Catholic faith and Belarusian language. He also promoted the idea of activisation of peasants for the cause of national liberation, the idea that was until then dominated by the gentry. He favored the Polish–Lithuanian Commonwealth's traditions of democracy, tolerance and freedom, as opposed to national oppression of cultures dominated by Imperial Russia:

There is some academic debate about which texts to attribute to Konstanty. Konstanty was unhappy with the timing and objectives of the January Uprising, which broke out on 23 January 1863. There had been a growing rift between him and other leaders of the uprising in Warsaw.

After the outbreak of the January Uprising, he was involved in the secret  in Vilnius. Soon he was promoted to the commissar of the Polish National Government for the Grodno Governorate. His writings made him popular both among the peasants and the gentry, which enabled the partisan units under his command to grow rapidly. Because of his successes he was promoted to the rank of Plenipotentiary Commissar of the Government for Lithuania, which made him the commander-in-chief of all partisan units fighting in the areas of the former Grand Duchy of Lithuania, which are in modern Lithuania, Belarus, eastern Poland and Ukraine.

Last months, capture, imprisonment, execution and burial
However, after initial successes against the Russian armies, the Russians moved a 120,000 men strong army to the area and the revolutionaries started to lose most of the skirmishes. Finally, Kalinowski was betrayed by one of his soldiers and handed over to the Russians.

He was imprisoned in Vilnius, where he wrote one of his most notable works - the Letter from Beneath the Gallows (Pismo z-pad szybienicy), a passionate credo for his compatriots. He was tried by a court-martial for leading the revolt against Russia and sentenced to death. On 22 March 1864, at the age 26, he was publicly executed on Lukiškės Square in Vilnius.

Kalinowski's remains, along with those of others, were clandestinely buried by the Tsarist authorities on the site of a military fortress on top of the Gediminas Hill in Vilnius. In 2017, Kalinowski's remains were excavated and identified, and solemnly reinterred in the Rasos Cemetery on 22 November 2019.

Legacy 
During the so-called Jeans Revolution, protesters who disputed the 2006 Belarusian presidential election symbolically renamed October Square, after the Bolshevik revolution, Kalinovski Square. Kalinovski Square was also the title of a documentary film about these events. In Uladzimir Karatkievich's King Stakh's Wild Hunt, one of the principal characters, Andrey Svetsilovich, had a portrait of Kalinowski above his writing desk.

During the 2022 Russian invasion of Ukraine, Belarusian volunteers fighting on the side of Ukraine formed a battalion named Kastuś Kalinoŭski, which later transformed into a regiment.

In Ukrainian Rivne, a street was named after Kalinowski.

See also
 Belarusization (1920s-1930s)
 Belarusian nationalism
 Belarusian national revival since the 19th century
 "Long Live Belarus!", patriotic slogan
 Soft Belarusization under Lukashenko

Related reading 
 Jan Zaprudnik & Thomas E. Bird: Peasant's Truth, the Tocsin of the 1863 Uprising in: Zapisy Belarusian Institute of Arts and Sciences. Vol. 14. New York, 1976.
 Kastuś Kalinoŭski, commentaries by Jan Zaprudnik and Thomas E. Bird: The 1863 Uprising in Byelorussia: "Peasants' Truth" and "Letters from Beneath the Gallows". Byelorussian Institute of Arts and Sciences, The Krecheuski Foundation, New York, 1980.

References

External links 

 Website about Kalinowski (in Belarusian)
 Biography of Konstanty Kalinowski, belarusguide.com
 Archival documents and materials - 1863-4 uprising in Belarus
 Why have Belarusan authorities forgotten Kastuś Kalinoŭski uprising?
 Konstanty Kalinowksi biography, belarus-misc.org
 Каліноўскі як далакоп беларускай мовы, 3 December 2013, in Belarusian

1838 births
1864 deaths
19th-century journalists
19th-century male writers
Anti-Russification activists
Belarusian nobility
Belarusian revolutionaries
Burials at Rasos Cemetery
Executed Belarusian people
Executed people from Podlaskie Voivodeship
January Uprising participants
Kalinowski family
Male journalists
Members of Polish government (January Uprising)
People executed by the Russian Empire by hanging
People from Białystok County
People from Grodnensky Uyezd
Russian journalists
Russian people of Belarusian descent
Russian people of Polish descent
Russian writers